is a Buddhist temple, formally known as  located in the Iwai district of the city of Asahi in Chiba Prefecture, Japan.

Etymology
The name of Ryūfuku-ji in the Japanese language is formed from two kanji characters. The first, means "dragon", and the second,  means "blessing" or "luck".

History 
According to legend, Ryūfuku-ji was  founded in the Heian period by the priest Kūkai. By tradition Kūkai carved the statue of Fudō-myōō located in the Hondō of the temple. The Fudō-myōō has adherents among locals of the area and the fisherman of the Kujukuri Coast. In the Sengoku period (1467 – 1573) the Shimada clan built Mibiro Castle to the south of the temple, but it and the temple were completely destroyed by fire as part of local conflicts during the period.

Structures 
Niōmon gate
Hondō main hall
Dainichiden -- Dainichi Nyorai chapel
Kannon-dō -- Kannon chapel
Daishi-dō -- Daishi chapel

Ryūfuku-ji Municipal Forest
Ryūfuku-ji is known for its numerous waterfalls, and many of them flow from the slopes surrounding the temple complex. Ryūfuku-ji and its surrounding forest are protected as a nature and wildlife refuse as part of the Ryūfuku-ji Municipal Forest. In late May and June the genjibotaru species of firefly appear around the hondō and waterfalls surrounding the temple. The temple is surrounded by dense vegetation. Notable examples of plant species such as the otakarakō ligularia and the asukainode fern are found throughout the temple complex. The forest has been designated a Prefectural Natural Monument.

Location 
Ryūfuku-ji and the Ryūfuku-ji Municipal Forest is in the Iwai District of Asahi, and is located four kilometers north of Iioka Station on the JR East Sōbu Main Line. The temple and municipal forest is accessible by bus from the station.

See also
 The Glossary of Japanese Buddhism for terms concerning Japanese Buddhism, Japanese Buddhist art, and Japanese Buddhist temple architecture.

References 

Religious organizations established in the 8th century
Buddhist temples in Chiba Prefecture
Asahi, Chiba